The 2017 North Las Vegas mayoral election was held on April 4, 2017 to elect the mayor of North Las Vegas, Nevada. It saw the re-election of John Jay Lee.

Results

References 

North Las Vegas
Mayoral elections in North Las Vegas, Nevada
North Las Vegas